Monte Costa Calda is a mountain in the region of Campania, Italy. 

Mountains of Campania